Echinelops is an extinct genus of elopiform ray-finned fish known from the Early Oligocene of eastern Anatolia, Turkey. It was first named by Alison M. Murray and Izzet Hoşgör in 2012 and the type species is Echinelops ozcani.

References

Elopomorpha
Fossil taxa described in 2012
Paleogene fish of Europe